Goran Sretenović (born 9 December 1968) is a Serbian football coach and a former player. Some Russian sources misspell his last name as Stretenovic.

He is currently one of the coaches for the Serbia national under-16 football team.

He allowed 9 goals for FC Uralan Elista against FC Lokomotiv Moscow on 3 November 2000 in a record biggest loss (0-9) in the history of the Russian Football Premier League. Overall, he allowed 18 goals in just 4 RFPL games.

He is one of the assistant managers of Ilija Stolica of the Serbian U-17 playing at the 2016 UEFA European Under-17 Championship.

References

1968 births
Living people
Serbian footballers
FK Radnički 1923 players
FC Elista players
Serbian expatriate footballers
Expatriate footballers in Russia
Russian Premier League players
Serbian football managers

Association football goalkeepers